This is the discography of electronic dance music producer and DJ Wolfgang Gartner.

Albums

Studio albums

Compilation albums
 Back Story (2012)

Extended plays
 Shapes (2007)
 Hot For Teacher (2008)
 Candy (2008)
 Casual Encounters of the 3rd Kind (2012)
 More Ways (2016)
 Medicine (2018)
 Tucson (2020)

Singles
2008
 "Killer" / "Flam Mode"
 "Montezuma" / "Frenetica"
 "Bounce" / "Get It"
 "Emergency"
 "Hook Shot" (b/w "Clap")
 "Flashback"

2009
 "Yin" / "Yang" (with Francis Preve)
 "Push & Rise"
 "Wolfgang's 5th Symphony" / "The Grey Agenda"
 "Fire Power" / "Latin Fever"

2010
 "Undertaker"
 "Conscindo" (with Mark Knight)
 "Animal Rights" (with Deadmau5) — UK #70
 "Illmerica" — UK #158
 "Space Junk"

2011
 "Forever" (featuring will.i.am) — UK #43
 "Ménage à Trois"
 "The Devil's Den" (with Skrillex)

2012
 "Go Home" (with will.i.am and Mick Jagger)
 "There and Back"
 "We Own the Night" (with Tiësto featuring Luciana) — UK #87
 "Redline"
 "Flexx"
 "Love & War" (b/w "Nuke")
 "Channel 42" (with deadmau5)
 "Evil Lurks" (with Tom Staar)

2013
 "Anaconda"
 "Overdose" (featuring Medina)
 "Hounds of Hell" (with Tommy Trash)
 "Piranha"

2014
 "We Are the Computers" (with Popeska)
 "Unholy" (featuring Bobby Saint)

2015
 "Turn Up" (featuring Wiley & Trina)

2016
 "Speed of Sound"
 "Baby Be Real" (featuring John Oates)
 "Devotion"

2017
 "Badboy Sound"
 "Borneo" (with Aero Chord)
 "Find A Way" (featuring Snow Tha Product)
 "Dubplate 99"

2018
 "Banshee" (with K?D)
 "Ching Ching"
 "The Upside Down" (with Jaykode)
 "Freak"
"Deja Vu"

2019
 "Ectoplasm"
 "28 Grams"

2020
 "Electric Soul"
 "Battlestations" (with Kill The Noise)

2021
 "Channel 43" (with Deadmau5)
 "Cosa Nostra"
 "Octopus Teeth"
 "The Original"
 "Mike Tyson"

2022
 "How Ya Like Me Now" (with Kill The Noise featuring Ericka Guitron)
 "Higher"
 "Believe" (featuring NEVRMIND)

Remixes
2008
 Cold Act Ill (Wolfgang Gartner's Monster Mix / Club Mix) – Classixx
 Helium (Wolfgang Gartner Remix) – Bass Kleph & Anthony Paul
 Funk Nasty (Wolfgang Gartner Remix) – Andy Caldwell
 Cruel World (Wolfgang Gartner Kindergarten Slam Mix) – Ron Reeser & Dan Saenz
 Me & Myself (Wolfgang Gartner Remix) – Ben DJ feat. Sushy
 Play (Wolfgang Gartner Remix / Dub) – Jin Sonic & Dive

2009
 Heartbreaker (Wolfgang Gartner Remix) – MSTRKRFT feat. John Legend
 I Will Be Here (Wolfgang Gartner Remix) – Tiësto & Sneaky Sound System
 Cruelty (Wolfgang Gartner Remix) – Alaric
 3 (Wolfgang Gartner Remix) – Britney Spears
 Morning After Dark (Wolfgang Gartner Remix) – Timbaland feat. Nelly Furtado & SoShy
 Imma Be (Wolfgang Gartner Club Mix) – The Black Eyed Peas

2010
 Blame It on the Girls (Wolfgang Gartner Remix / Dub) – Mika

2012
 Paddling Out (Wolfgang Gartner Remix) – Miike Snow
 Sorry For Party Rocking (Wolfgang Gartner Remix) – LMFAO
 Now or Never (Wolfgang Gartner Edit) – Popeska

2015
 I Had This Thing (Wolfgang Gartner Remix) – Röyksopp

References 

Discographies of American artists
House music discographies
Electronic music discographies